Justus Akinbayo Akinsanya, FRCN (31 December 1936 – 11 August 2005) was a nurse, human biologist, nurse educator and researcher.

Early life and career
Born in Okun-Owa, Ijebu, Nigeria (near Lagos), Akinsanya qualified in 1960 in general nursing, with a specialty in tuberculosis cases. In 1967 he did post-registration courses in orthopaedic, dermatological and psychiatric nursing. He entered the University of London where he obtained a BSc (Hons) degree in Human Biology followed by a PhD degree.

Akinsanya developed the Akinsanya model of bionursing (1985), which he defined as clinical nursing that uses in practice the principles of natural sciences such as biology.

He held positions as a teacher, administrator and researcher, including being a lecturer at the Institute of Management and Technology in Enugu from 1976 until 1977, before becoming Reader and later Professor and Head of the Health Care Research Unit at the Dorset Institute, now Bournemouth University, from 1985 until 1989.

He subsequently took up the post of Dean of the newly created Faculty of Health and Social Work at Anglia Polytechnic University from 1989 until 1996, where his wife, Cynthia, worked as a lecturer in pre-registration nursing.

He was made an Emeritus Professor on retirement in 1996, and then devoted his time to the charitable activities of Disability Croydon, Nurses Fund for Nurses and the Nigerian Council of Elders, and served as a local education authority (LEA) governor of two schools in Croydon.

Personal life
He had been involved in the Nursing Council of Nigeria and he was made a fellow of the UK Royal College of Nursing (FRCN) in 1988.

Death
He died in London at the age of 68 after contracting an infection at the International Council of Nurses conference in Taiwan some months earlier.

References

External links
Justus A. Akinsanya Website

British nurses
Nigerian nurses
Nigerian emigrants to the United Kingdom
Yoruba nurses
Academics of Anglia Ruskin University
Academics of Bournemouth University
Alumni of the University of London
Infectious disease deaths in England
Fellows of the Royal College of Nursing
1936 births
2005 deaths
Male nurses
Nursing school deans
Nursing researchers
Nursing educators
Yoruba academics
Nigerian academic administrators
British academic administrators